South Street is an east-west arterial highway in the southern suburbs of Perth, Western Australia. It runs from Canning Vale to Fremantle, and is part of State Route 13.

Notable locations along South Street include: 
 Murdoch railway station
 Murdoch University main campus
 Fiona Stanley Hospital
 St John of God Murdoch Hospital

A section of South Street between Kwinana Freeway and Vahland Avenue has one lane in each direction reserved as a bus lane during peak times. The CircleRoute bus route runs along part of South Street between Fremantle and Murdoch.

It is named South Street because its westernmost portion forms the southern edge of Fremantle.

Major Intersections
All intersections listed are controlled by traffic signals unless otherwise indicated.

See also

References

Roads in Perth, Western Australia
Murdoch, Western Australia